The following is a list of the Metal Hammer Golden Gods Awards winners.

Introduction
The awards were conceived by Chris Ingham, John O'Sullivan & Dave Bianchi, and first held at the Kentish Town Forum in London 2003. The show was owned by Future Publishing till 2013, TeamRock 2014–16 and was bought back by Future in 2017. It has been produced by John O'Sullivan since its inception.

The shows

2003
Held at the Forum, London
Hosted by Ian Camfield
Live main stage performance by Murderdolls, Shadows Fall, Soil and Raging Speedhorn.

Winners
 Best Album: AFI – Sing the Sorrow

2004
Held at Ocean, London
Hosted by Ian Campfield
Live main stage performance by HIM, Akercocke and Young Heart Attack.

Winners
 Best Album: Killswitch Engage – The End of Heartache

2005
Held at the Astoria, London
Hosted by Ian Campfield
Live main stage performance by Anthrax, Nightwish, Shadows Fall, Bullet for My Valentine and Trivium.

Winners
 Best UK Band: Lost Prophets
 Best Live: Slipknot
 Best Label: Roadrunner Records
 Best Newcomer: Nightwish
 Best Video: My Chemical Romance – "Helena" 
 Spirit of Hammer: Black Sabbath
 Icon: Ville Valo
 Riff Lord: Zakk Wylde
 Young Guitar – Dimebag Tribute: Herman Li
 Best International: The Used
 Best Album: Judas Priest – Angel of Retribution
 Best Metal Band: Anthrax
 Golden God: Lemmy

2006
Held at Koko, London
Hosted By Ian Campfield
Live main stage performance by Bullet for My Valentine, DragonForce, Lacuna Coil and Viking Skull.

Winners
 Best Album: Coheed and Cambria – Good Apollo, I'm Burning Star IV, Volume One: From Fear Through the Eyes of Madness
 Riff Lord: Jerry Cantrell
 Best Album of the Past 20 Years: Slayer - Reign in Blood
 Best UK Band: Bullet for My Valentine
 Best International Band: Avenged Sevenfold
 Best Live Band: Trivium

2007
Held at Koko, London
Hosted by Jamey Jasta
Live main stage performance by Machine Head, Dimmu Borgir, Lamb of God, Turisas and Priestess.

Winners
 Best Album: Machine Head – The Blackening

2008
Held at Indigo at the O2, London
Hosted by Oderus Urungus
Live main stage performance by Disturbed, Children of Bodom, In Flames, Apocalyptica and Testament.

Winners
 Best Album: Testament – The Formation of Damnation
 Best UK Band: Iron Maiden
 Best Live Band: Machine Head

2009
Held at Indigo at the O2, London
Hosted by Jason Rouse
Live main stage performance by Trivium, Anvil, Amon Amarth, DevilDriver and Saxon.

Winners
 Best Album: Lamb of God – Wrath

2010
Held at Indigo at the O2, London
Hosted by Steel Panther
Live main stage performance by Steel Panther, Airbourne, Five Finger Death Punch, Skindred and Evile.
HMS Hammer performances by Nonpoint, Sonic Syndicate, Rise to Remain and Hellyeah.

Winners
 Best New Band: Rise to Remain
 Best Underground: Immortal
 Best Drummer: Mike Portnoy
 Global Metal: Demonic Resurrection
 Best Live: Machine Head
 Best Event: Download Festival
 Riff Lord: Joe Perry
 Spirit of Hammer: Sir Christopher Lee
 Best UK: Bullet for My Valentine
 Metal As ####: Evile
 Dimebag Darrell 'Shredder': Zoltan Bathory
 Breakthrough Artist: Five Finger Death Punch
 Inspiration: Tom G Warrior
 Best Album: Heaven & Hell – The Devil You Know
 Best International Band: Lamb of God
 Defenders of the Faith: Tracy and Jon Morter
 Golden God: Zakk Wylde

2011
Held at Indigo at the O2, London
Hosted by Alice Cooper
Live main stage performance by Twisted Sister, Skindred, Devin Townsend, Sylosis and Buckcherry.
HMS Hammer performances by The Dead Lay Waiting, Tesseract, Black Spiders and Biohazard.

Winners
 Best New Band: The Damned Things
 Metal as ####: Nergal
 Best Underground: Primordial
 Dimebag Darrell 'Shredder': Gus G
 Breakthrough Artist: Sabaton
 Best UK: Iron Maiden
 Best Live: Skindred
 Inspiration: Twisted Sister
 Best International Band: Avenged Sevenfold
 Best Album: Killing Joke – Absolute Dissent
 Best Event: The Big 4 Coming Together
 Riff Lord: Pepper Keenan / Kirk Windstein
 Spirit of Hammer: Diamond Head
 Icons: Judas Priest
 Golden God: Rob Zombie

2012
Held at Indigo at the O2, London
Hosted by Chris Jericho
Live main stage performance by Anthrax, Sabaton, Ghost, Biohazard and Watain.
HMS Hammer performances by Shadows Fall, Fozzy, While She Sleeps, Attica Rage and Evil Scarecrow.

Winners

|-
|rowspan=17 | 2012
|-
| The Defiled || Best New Band || 
|-
| Watain || Best Underground Band || 
|-
| Devin Townsend || 'Dimebag Darrell Shredder' Award || 
|-
| Ghost || Breakthrough Band Award || 
|-
| Rammstein || Best Live Band Award || 
|-
| Iron Maiden's U.K. Tour || Best Event Award || 
|-
| Lamb of God || Best International Band Award || 
|-
| Saxon || Best UK Band Award || 
|-
| Mastodon – The Hunter || Best Album Award || 
|-
| Anthrax || Metal as #### Award || 
|-
| Vinnie Paul || Best Drummer || 
|-
| Roadrunner Records || Inspiration Award || 
|-
| Robb Flynn and Phil Demmel || Riff Lord Award || 
|-
| Bill Bailey || Spirit of Hammer Award || 
|-
| Fear Factory || Icon Award || 
|-
| Joey DeMaio || The Golden God Award || 
|-

2013
Held at Indigo at the O2, London
Hosted by Devin Townsend
Live main stage performance by Motörhead, Airbourne, Five Finger Death Punch, Coal Chamber and Paradise Lost.
HMS Hammer performances by Kvelertak, Visions Of Disorder, The Defiled and Heavens Basement.

Winners

|-
|rowspan=17 | 2013
|-
| Bleed from Within || Best New Band || 
|-
| The Algorithm || Best Underground Band || 
|-
| Eric Calderone || 'Dimebag Darrell Shredder' Award || 
|-
| Asking Alexandria || Breakthrough Band Award || 
|-
| Gojira || Best Live Band Award || 
|-
| The Heavy Metal Census Campaign || Best Event Award || 
|-
| Stone Sour || Best International Band Award || 
|-
| Black Sabbath || Best UK Band Award || 
|-
| Black Sabbath – 13 || Best Album Award || 
|-
| Burgerkill || Metal as #### Award || 
|-
| Paradise Lost || Inspiration Award || 
|-
| Scott Gorham || Riff Lord Award || 
|-
| Brian Blessed || Spirit of Hammer Award || 
|-
| Alice in Chains || Icon Award || 
|-
| Motörhead || The Golden God Award || 
|-
| Doro || Legend Award || 
|-

2014
Held at Indigo at the O2, London
Hosted by Steel Panther
Live main stage performance by Steel Panther, The Dillinger Escape Plan, Black Stone Cherry, While She Sleeps and Behemoth.
HMS Hammer performances by Orange Goblin, Kill Devil Hill, Upon a Burning Body, Hounds and Dying Fetus.

Winners

|-
|rowspan=18 | 2014
|-
| Devil You Know || Best New Band || 
|-
| Wardruna || Best Underground Band || 
|-
| Misha Mansoor || 'Dimebag Darrell Shredder' Award || 
|-
| Of Mice & Men || Breakthrough Artist Award || 
|-
| Killswitch Engage || Best Live Band Award || 
|-
| Avenged Sevenfold || Best International Band Award || 
|-
| Iron Maiden || Best UK Band Award || 
|-
| Behemoth – The Satanist || Best Album Award || 
|-
| Hanoi Rocks || Inspiration Award || 
|-
| Mark Tremonti || Riff Lord Award || 
|-
| David Prowse || Spirit of Hammer Award || 
|-
| Michael Schenker || Icon Award || 
|-
| Mikael Åkerfeldt || The Golden God Award || 
|-
| Orphaned Land and Khalas || Global Metal Award || 
|-
| Devin Townsend || King of the Internet || 
|-
| Grand Theft Auto V || Game of the Year || 
|-
| Steel Panther – "Party Like It's the End of the World" || Video of the Year || 
|-

2015
Held at Indigo at the O2, London
Hosted by Scott Ian
Live main stage performance by Suicidal Tendencies, We Are Harlot, Babymetal featuring DragonForce, At the Gates and Killing Joke.
HMS Hammer performances by Code Orange, Butcher Babies, Upon a Burning Body and Napalm Death.

Winners

|-
|rowspan=17 | 2015
|-
| We Are Harlot || Best New Band || 
|-
| Winterfylleth || Best Underground Band || 
|-
| Richie Faulkner || 'Dimebag Darrell Shredder' Award || 
|-
| Babymetal || Breakthrough Band Award || 
|-
| Of Mice & Men || Best Live Band Award || 
|-
| Slipknot || Best International Band Award || 
|-
| Bring Me the Horizon || Best UK Band Award || 
|-
| Faith No More – Sol Invictus || Best Album Award || 
|-
| At the Gates || Inspiration Award || 
|-
| Matt Taylor || Spirit of Hammer Award || 
|-
| Mike Muir || Icon Award || 
|-
| Dave Mustaine || The Golden God Award || 
|-
| District Unknown/Martyrs of Metal || Global Metal Award || 
|-
| Anthony Vincent || King of the internet || 
|-
| Epitaph Records || Best Independent Label || 
|-
| Tommy Thayer || Defender of the Faith || 
|-

2016
Held at the Hammersmith Apollo, London
Hosted by Jamey Jasta
Live main stage performance by Amon Amarth, Halestorm, Gojira and 'A Salute to Lemmy' with Saxon featuring Phil & Mikkey.

Winners

|-
|rowspan=16 | 2016
|-
| Creeper || Best New Band || 
|-
| Enslaved || Best Underground band || 
|-
| Lzzy Hale || 'Dimebag Darrell Shredder' Award || 
|-
| Beartooth || Breakthrough Band Award || 
|-
| Lamb of God || Best Live Band Award || 
|-
| Ghost || Best International Band Award || 
|-
| Asking Alexandria || Best UK Band Award || 
|-
| Iron Maiden – The Book of Souls || Best Album Award || 
|-
| Anthrax || Inspiration Award || 
|-
| Phil Campbell || Riff Lord Award || 
|-
| Nikki Sixx || Icon Award || 
|-
| Joey Jordison || The Golden God Award || 
|-
| Chthonic || Global Metal Band  || 
|-
| Parkway Drive - "Vice Grip" || Video of the Year || 
|-
| Prosthetic Records || Best Independent Label || 
|-

2017 
 
Held at Indigo, O2, London
Hosted by Chris Jericho
Live main stage performance by Orange Goblin, Avatar, Clutch and Mastodon.

Winners 
 Best New Band: Venom Prison
 Best Underground Band: Pallbearer
 Best UK Band: Architects
 Best International Band: Avenged Sevenfold
 Best Live Band: Mastodon
 Best Independent Label: Nuclear Blast
 Dimebag Darrell 'Shredder': Joel O'Keeffe (Airbourne)
 Game of the Year: Iron Maiden: The Legacy of the Beast
 Breakthrough: Avatar

Non fan-voted categories 
 Riff Lord: Devin Townsend
 Defender of the Faith: Ben Ward (Orange Goblin) & his partner Sandie Soriano
 Inspiration: Exodus
 Best Album: Gojira – Magma
 Spirit of Hammer: Prophets of Rage
 Icon: The Dillinger Escape Plan
 Golden God: Black Sabbath

2018 
Held at Indigo at the O2, London
Hosted by Jamey Jasta
Live main stage performance by Carpenter Brut, Baroness, Myrkur, Meshuggah and Parkway Drive.

Winners 

 Best New Band: Lovebites
 Best Underground Band: Wolves in the Throne Room
 Best UK Band: Judas Priest
 Best International Band: Arch Enemy
 Best Event: Download Festival
 Best Live Band: Lacuna Coil
 Best Independent Label: Sumerian Records
 Breakthrough Artist: Code Orange

Non fan-voted categories 
 Riff Lord: Wes Borland
 Defender Of The Faith: Parkway Drive
 Inspiration: Meshuggah
 Best Album: Myrkur – Mareridt
 Global Metal Award: Kaoteon 
 Spirit Of Hammer: Jessica Pimentel
 Icon: James Keenan
 Golden God: Ozzy Osbourne

References

Awards established in 2003
Rock music awards